The 2022–23 Georgia State Panthers men's basketball team represented Georgia State University during the 2022–23 NCAA Division I men's basketball season. The Panthers, led by first-year head coach Jonas Hayes, played their home games at new the GSU Convocation Center in Atlanta, Georgia as members of the Sun Belt Conference.

Previous season 
The Panthers finished the 2021–22 season 18–11, 9–5 in Sun Belt play to finish in third place. They defeated Arkansas State, Appalachian State, and Louisiana to win the Sun Belt tournament championship. As a result, they received the conference's automatic bid to the NCAA tournament as the No. 16 seed in the West region. They lost in the first round to overall No. 1 seed Gonzaga.

On March 27, 2022, head coach Rob Lanier left the school to take the head coaching position at SMU. On April 6, the school named Xavier assistant and former Georgia State player Jonas Hayes the team's new basketball coach.

The season marked the Panthers' final season at the GSU Sports Arena, with the new GSU Convocation Center set to open for the 2022–23 season.

Offseason

Departures

Incoming Transfers

2022 Recruiting class

2023 Recruiting class

Preseason

Preseason Sun Belt Conference poll 
The Panthers were picked to finish in fifth place in the conference's preseason poll.

Roster

Schedule and results

|-
!colspan=12 style=| Exhibition

|-
!colspan=9 style=| Non-conference regular season

|-
!colspan=9 style=| Sun Belt Conference regular season

|-
!colspan=9 style=| Sun Belt tournament

References

Georgia State Panthers men's basketball seasons
Georgia State
Georgia State Panthers men's basketball
Georgia State Panthers men's basketball